A grison , , also known as a South American wolverine, is any mustelid in the genus Galictis. Native to Central and South America, the genus contains two extant species: the greater grison (Galictis vittata), which is found widely in South America, through Central America to southern Mexico; and the lesser grison (Galictis cuja), which is restricted to the southern half of South America.

Names 
Compare the word Galidictis (a mongoose genus).

Description 
The lesser grison is slightly smaller than the greater grison. Grisons generally resemble a skunk, but with a smaller tail, shorter legs, wider neck, and more robust body. The pelage along the back is a frosted gray with black legs, throat, face, and belly. A sharp white stripe extends from the forehead to the back of the neck.

Habitat 
They are found in a wide range of habitats from semi-open shrub and woodland to low-elevation forests. They are generally terrestrial, burrowing and nesting in holes in fallen trees or rock crevices, often living underground. They are omnivorous, consuming fruit and small animals (including mammals). Little is known about grison behavior for multiple reasons, including that their necks are so wide compared to their heads, an unusual difficulty that has made radio tracking problematic.

Evolution

Extant species

Fossils
Grisons first appeared in South America during the early Pleistocene about 2.5 million years ago. They may be descended from the fossil genera Trigonictis and Sminthosinus, which lived in North America during the mid to late Pliocene.

 † Galictis hennigi
 † Galictis sanandresensis
 † Galictis sorgentinii

References

 Nowak, Ronald M. (2005). Walker's Carnivores of the World. Baltimore: Johns Hopkins Press 

Ictonychinae
Mammal genera
Mammals of South America
Taxa named by Thomas Bell (zoologist)